Events from the year 1680 in the Kingdom of Scotland.

Incumbents

 Monarch – Charles II

Judiciary 
 Lord President of the Court of Session – James Dalrymple
 Lord Justice General – Sir George Mackenzie; William Douglas from 1 June
 Lord Justice Clerk – Sir Richard Maitland

Events 
 22 June – Sanquhar Declaration: Radical Presbyterian Michael Cameron, in the presence of his brother, Covenanter leader Richard Cameron, reads a speech in Sanquhar's public square disavowing allegiance to the King.
 13 July – Battle of Altimarlach near Wick, Caithness: Men of Clan Campbell led by John Campbell rout Clan Sinclair under George Sinclair of Keiss in a dispute over land rights, the last significant Scottish clan battle.
 22 July – Battle of Airds Moss in Ayrshire: Armed Covenanters are defeated in a skirmish; their leaders Richard and Michael Cameron are killed and David Hackston taken prisoner and on 30 July executed in Edinburgh for murder.
 Innerpeffray Library, the oldest known (and surviving) public (lending) library in Scotland, is established.
 Last definitely recorded native wolf in Scotland killed by Sir Ewen Cameron in Killiecrankie.
 Ongoing – The Killing Time.

Births
 22 June – Ebenezer Erskine, Secessionist minister (died 1754)
 John Willison, evangelical Church of Scotland minister and religious writer (died 1750)

Deaths
 26 September – John Dury, Scottish-born Calvinist minister (born 1596)

See also

Timeline of Scottish history
 1680 in England

References

 
Years of the 17th century in Scotland